John Richard Cole (15 February 1907 – September 1997) was an English first-class cricketer and British Army officer. His military career spanned from 1927–1959 with the Loyal Regiment, during which he served in the Second World War. He also played first-class cricket for the British Army cricket team.

Life and military career
Cole was born at Clapham and was educated at Emanuel School. From there he attended the Royal Military College, Sandhurst. He graduated from Sandhurst in September 1927, entering into the Loyal Regiment as a second lieutenant. He was promoted to the rank of lieutenant in September 1930. He made his debut in first-class cricket for the British Army cricket team against the Marylebone Cricket Club (MCC) at Lord's in 1930. He made two further first-class appearances for the Army in 1931, against Oxford University and the MCC, before making a final appearance in 1932 against the touring South Americans at Aldershot. He scored a total of 112 runs in his four first-class matches, with a high score of 63 against the South Americans.

He was seconded for service with the Colonial Office in June 1933, before promotion to the rank of captain in September 1937. In June 1938, he was appointed to be a deputy assistant provost marshal at Shanghai. Cole served during the Second World War and was mentioned in dispatches in recognition of gallant and distinguished service in the Malayan Campaign. He was promoted to the rank of lieutenant colonel in October 1949. He was promoted to the rank of major in October 1944. He was promoted to the rank of colonel in January 1954. He retired from active service in December 1959.

In 1982 he moved to Harare, Zimbabwe where he lived for the rest of his life. Cole died in his sleep at Harare, Zimbabwe in September 1997.

References

External links

1907 births
1997 deaths
People from Clapham
People educated at Emanuel School
Graduates of the Royal Military College, Sandhurst
Loyal Regiment officers
English cricketers
British Army cricketers
British Army personnel of World War II
British emigrants to Zimbabwe
Military personnel from Surrey